Athroostachys is a Brazilian genus of bamboo in the grass family.

The only known species is Athroostachys capitata, native to Brazil (States of Bahia, Mato Grosso, Paraná, Rio de Janeiro).

See also 
 List of Poaceae genera

References 

Bambusoideae
Endemic flora of Brazil
Bambusoideae genera
Monotypic Poaceae genera